Diploschizia kutisi is a species of sedge moth in the genus Diploschizia. It was described by John B. Heppner in 1997. It is found in Florida.

References

Moths described in 1997
Glyphipterigidae